The Frank U. Halter House is a historic house at 1355 College Avenue in Conway, Arkansas.  It is a -story wood-frame structure, with a complex gable-and-hip roof characteristic of the Queen Anne style.  Also typical of that style are its wraparound porch with spindled woodwork, a turreted corner pavilion, and bargeboard in some of the gable ends.  Built in 1905, it is one of the city's finest example of Queen Anne architecture.

The house was listed on the National Register of Historic Places in 1980.

See also
National Register of Historic Places listings in Faulkner County, Arkansas

References

Houses on the National Register of Historic Places in Arkansas
Queen Anne architecture in Arkansas
Colonial Revival architecture in Arkansas
Houses completed in 1905
Houses in Conway, Arkansas
National Register of Historic Places in Faulkner County, Arkansas
1905 establishments in Arkansas